The Yokosuka MXY8 Akigusa (秋草, "Autumn grass") was a training glider built in parallel with the Mitsubishi J8M rocket-powered interceptor aircraft.

Design and development
The J8M was to have simply been a licence-built Messerschmitt Me 163 Komet, but due to difficulties in obtaining technical materials from Germany, it eventually had to be designed almost from scratch. The MXY8 was designed in parallel with the J8M to validate the design, and then to provide pilot training during the development of the actual interceptor. The Army designation for the type was Ku-13.

The MXY8 was built entirely of wood, and fitted with ballast tanks that would be filled with water to simulate the weight and therefore flight characteristics of a fully equipped J8M. Some 50-60 of these gliders were eventually built.

A more advanced trainer, the MXY9, equipped with a primitive jet engine was planned, but was never produced.

Many sources apply the designation MXY8 to the Yokosuka MXY7 Ohka kamikaze weapon.

Specifications

See also

References

Notes

Bibliography

 

1940s Japanese military trainer aircraft
1940s military gliders
MXY8